Catopta griseotincta is a moth in the family Cossidae. It was described by Franz Daniel in 1940. It is found in China in Tibet, northern Yunnan and Sichuan.

References

Moths described in 1940
Catoptinae